Natalie Dianová (born 1 January 1989 in Valašské Meziříčí) is a Czech modern pentathlete. At the 2012 Summer Olympics, she competed in the women's competition, finishing in 22nd place.

References

External links
 

1989 births
Living people
Czech female modern pentathletes
Olympic modern pentathletes of the Czech Republic
Modern pentathletes at the 2012 Summer Olympics
World Modern Pentathlon Championships medalists
People from Valašské Meziříčí
Sportspeople from the Zlín Region